Lethal acantholytic epidermolysis bullosa is a fatal genetic skin disorder caused by mutations in DSP

See also
 Desmoplakin
 List of conditions caused by problems with junctional proteins
Epidermolysis bullosa

Notes

External links 

Genodermatoses